Code of the Sea is a 1924 American silent drama film produced by Famous Players-Lasky and distributed by Paramount Pictures. It was directed by Victor Fleming and starred Rod La Rocque and Jacqueline Logan.

Cast

Preservation
Prints of Code of the Sea survive in the Library of Congress collection as well as George Eastman House and UCLA Film and Television Archive.

See also
 Godless Men (1920)
 Stormswept (1923)
 Rugged Water (1925)
 Sensation Seekers (1927)
 The Perfect Storm (2000)

References

External links

 
 
 Grapevine Video's offering of the film for the first time on home video/DVD: Code of the Sea
 Norwegian language lobby poster

1924 films
1924 drama films
American black-and-white films
Silent American drama films
American silent feature films
Films about the United States Coast Guard
Films directed by Victor Fleming
Surviving American silent films
1920s American films
Silent adventure films